Jobo Rinjang is a mountain located in Namche, Solukhumbhu, Nepal at an elevation of  above sea level. It was first climbed in 2009 by Joseph Puryear and David Gottlieb.

References 

Mountains of Koshi Province
Six-thousanders of the Himalayas
Mountain ranges of the Himalayas
Solukhumbu District